Maine Question 2, formally entitled "An Act To Enhance Access to Affordable Health Care", was a citizen-initiated ballot measure that appeared on the November 7, 2017 statewide ballot in the State of Maine. Maine Question 2 sought to expand Medicaid eligibility under the terms of the Affordable Care Act. The measure passed.

Background
Expanded eligibility for the Medicaid program, called MaineCare in Maine, was a provision of the Affordable Care Act signed into law by President Barack Obama on March 23, 2010. The expansion was originally required of states as a condition of all federal Medicaid funding, but the United States Supreme Court ruled in National Federation of Independent Business v. Sebelius that such expansion was optional for states.

Maine Republican Gov. Paul LePage criticized the eligibility requirements for MaineCare, feeling that it was too easy to qualify for as it existed when he took office in 2010.  He was a staunch opponent of the Affordable Care Act, believing that it violated the Constitution and took freedoms from citizens.  LePage vetoed six efforts to expand MaineCare eligibility. On one occasion, LePage described efforts by the Maine Legislature to write an expansion bill that would garner bipartisan support as having "no compassion".

Supporters of expansion, led by Maine Equal Justice Partners, announced on October 12, 2016 that they intended to launch a petition drive to put the issue to the voters. LePage's spokesperson criticized the effort as "another attempt by liberals to pass welfare expansion".

Maine Secretary of State Matthew Dunlap announced on February 21, 2017 that supporters of the measure had submitted over 66,000 verified signatures, far above the 61,123 required to place a measure on the ballot.

The question that appeared on petition forms was: "Do you want Maine to provide health insurance through Medicaid for qualified adults under the age of 65 with incomes at or below 138 percent of the federal poverty line?"  During the comment period before the question's wording was finalized, several Republican legislators disputed the inclusion of the word "insurance" in the question, arguing that MaineCare benefits are not insurance, but welfare benefits. Those legislators opined that the question did not meet the Maine Constitution's requirement that referendum questions be "simple, clear, concise, and direct".  They further noted that the word "insurance" did not appear in the proposed referendum itself. Supporters defended the use of the word "insurance" on the grounds that MaineCare does not provide cash to recipients, but directly pays providers of medical services.  At the end of the comment period, Secretary Dunlap announced that the final wording of the question would replace the word "insurance" with "coverage". Representatives of both sides of the issue announced their support of the decision.

The ballot question read as follows: "Do you want Maine to expand Medicaid to provide healthcare coverage for qualified adults under age 65 with incomes at or below 138% of the federal poverty level, which in 2017 means $16,643 for a single person and $22,412 for a family of two?"

Campaign

Endorsements

Supporters

Individuals
 Janet Mills,  Maine Attorney General
 George J. Mitchell, former United States Senate Majority Leader
 Chellie Pingree, U.S. Representative

Organizations

Media
Bangor Daily News
MaineToday Media newspapers; Portland Press Herald, Kennebec Journal, Morning Sentinel

Opponents
Paul LePage, Governor of Maine
Mary Mayhew, former commissioner of the Maine Department of Health and Human Services and candidate for governor in 2018
Rep. Heather Sirocki of the Maine House of Representatives
Rep. Karen Vachon of the Maine House of Representatives
Maine Department of Health and Human Services
Welfare to Work PAC

Results and aftermath
On November 7, 2017, Maine Question 2 passed, 203,080 to 141,436.

Gov. LePage stated that he would not implement the Medicaid expansion required by Maine Question 2 unless the Legislature funded it without a tax increase and without using money from the state Rainy Day Fund. Medicaid expansion became an issue in the 2018 elections. Democratic gubernatorial candidate Janet Mills stated she would implement the law, and Republican Shawn Moody stated he would continue LePage's refusal to do so.

Supporters of expansion sued the LePage administration on April 30, 2018 to force the expansion to be implemented.  On June 4, 2018, Judge Michaela Murphy ruled that Maine Department of Health and Human Services Commissioner Ricker Hamilton must submit a plan for expansion by June 11 to allow MaineCare to start accepting newly eligible applicants on July 2, 2018.  LePage said that he would rather go to jail than implement the expansion without a funding mechanism that met his criteria.

LePage's successor, Democrat Janet Mills, signed an order implementing the referendum as one of her first acts, enabling signups to begin immediately.

References

External links
Mainers for Health Care, supporters of the referendum
Maine Vote No on 2, opponents of the referendum

Affordable Care Act
2017 Maine ballot measures